Raphimetopus is a genus of snout moths. It was described by George Hampson in 1918.

Species
 Raphimetopus ablutella (Zeller, 1839)
 Raphimetopus incarnatella Ragonot, 1887
 Raphimetopus nitidicostella Ragonot, 1887
 Raphimetopus spinifrontella Ragonot, 1888

References

Anerastiini
Pyralidae genera